Sussex Technical High School is a public high school in Georgetown, Delaware.  Its enrollment at last count was roughly 1,300 students.  As a choice school, each year over 600 eighth-grade students in Sussex County apply for 300 openings. The mascot for the school is a raven.

Also known as Sussex Tech, the school was one of two Delaware high schools recognized by the U.S. Department of Education as a Blue Ribbon School in 2008 for academic achievement. It was previously selected by the Department of Education in 1996 as one of ten showcase site schools, receiving the New American High Schools award for high levels of success.

The school is operated by Sussex Technical School District, an overlay district serving all of Sussex County.

History

Built in 1961, Sussex Tech started as the Sussex Vocational-Technical High School. At that time, it provided students career training to prepare Sussex County students to enter the workforce after high school graduation. Students would spend half the day at their home high school, then spend the rest of the day at Sussex Tech learning a trade.

Sussex Tech became a full-time high school in 1991, offering a comprehensive program of academic courses as well as technical education. With additions, the school grew to a total of 82 classrooms.  By 2009, Sussex Tech had 16 technical fields of study from which students could choose.

More students were accepted into the school in the 2012–2013 school year, making it one of Sussex Tech's most historical years. Also, Sussex Tech's Raven Nation Marching Band was featured in Chicago's McDonald's Thanksgiving Parade in 2012.

School library
With its full-time conversion in 1991, Sussex Tech also opened its own library and hired a librarian. This project started in a small storage room with a desk, chair, one computer and no books. It quickly filled to capacity.

In 2000, the school opened its current library, known as the Benjamin Franklin Information Center. The new library emphasized the school's technical focus, relying on computer workstations for access to resources in external networks. Sussex Tech's library led the state of Delaware by 2007, with 75 computers available for its students.

During 2007, the school library also became the first to implement Delaware's Statewide Library Catalog and Schoolrooms system, an interface allowing students to reserve and request books from any library in the state, and also providing online access to magazines and newspapers. Books requested from other locations through the statewide system are delivered to the school's library.

Student body and staff
In 2009 it had 1,251 students and 11 administrators.

Financial Scandals 
From 2012 through 2017, Sussex Tech suffered a series of financial scandals.

In October 2013, a nutrition supervisor for the school worked with federal and state auditors to resolve a discrepancy in the school's food budget. Auditors found that $8,000 were missing from the account, and the nutrition supervisor informed them that the school's principal purchased televisions and audio equipment for the cafeteria. The supervisor contended that this was not a valid purchase of the food funding. Subsequently, he was terminated from his position and filed a whistleblower lawsuit alleging wrongful termination. The case has not yet gone to trial.

In 2015, a teacher in the school's adult division was terminated after reporting illegal conduct to the adult division's principal. The teacher alleged that the school was mass-producing copyrighted text books and other materials without the consent of the publishers. The estimated lost profits exceeded $500,000. After reporting the misconduct to the school, he was terminated. The case was settled in January 2017 for $95,000.

In 2017, a state auditor's report found financial mismanagement at Sussex Tech. The audit report focused on an event from 2012. In 2012, a businessman purchased land for $110,000, and then two weeks later sold it to Sussex Tech for $200,000. A few months later, the same businessman was awarded the contract to redevelop the same parcel and construct a new bus entrance for the school. The report found that the businessman and/or his company received over $3.8 million from 2011 through 2016 without ever bidding on any additional projects.   In June 2017, during the investigation, senior officials at the high school were placed on paid leave.

Athletics
Sussex Technical High School's athletic teams participate in the Henlopen Conference.

References

External links

High schools in Sussex County, Delaware
Educational institutions established in 1960
Public high schools in Delaware
1960 establishments in Delaware